The 1950 British Empire Games was the fourth staging of what is now called the Commonwealth Games. It was held in Auckland, New Zealand between 4 and 11 February 1950, after a 12-year gap from the third edition of the games. A documentary film of the games was made by the New Zealand National Film Unit. The main venue was Eden Park, although the closing ceremonies were held at Western Springs Stadium, see New Zealand at the 1950 British Empire Games. The fourth games were originally awarded to Montreal, Canada and were to be held in 1942 but were cancelled due to World War II.

Participating teams

(Teams participating for the first time in bold).

Games venue

The main stadium was at Eden Park. Other venues were the Auckland Town Hall (boxing and wrestling), the Drill Hall (fencing), Western Springs (cycling and the closing ceremony) Lake Karapiro (rowing), and the Newmarket Olympic Pool (swimming). Total attendance was 246,694; higher than the following three Games, 1954 (159,636), 1958 (178,621) and 1962 (224,987).

Medals by country
At the 1950 British Empire Games all the teams won at least one medal.

Medals by event

Athletics

Boxing

Cycling

Track

Road

Diving

Men's events

Women's events

Fencing

Men's events

Women's events

Lawn bowls

Rowing
All events were for men only. Three special trains took 1500 people to Cambridge on 7 February 1950.

Swimming

Men's events

Women's events

Water polo
Water polo was contested by men's teams only, with New Zealand and Australia the only two teams entered. The matches were played at the Olympic Pool in Newmarket.

Weightlifting
All events were for men only.

Wrestling
All events were for men only.

References

Further reading

External links
 "Auckland 1950". Thecgf.com. Commonwealth Games Federation.
 "Results and Medalists—1950 British Empire Games". Thecgf.com. Commonwealth Games Federation.

 
British Empire Games
Sports competitions in Auckland
1950s in Auckland
International sports competitions hosted by New Zealand
Commonwealth Games in New Zealand
British Empire Games
Commonwealth Games by year
British Empire Games